Miles Lucas, nicknamed "Pepe", is an American former Negro league pitcher who played in the 1920s.

Lucas played for the Harrisburg Giants in 1925 and again in 1927. In eight recorded games on the mound, he posted a 3.43 ERA over 39.1 innings.

References

External links
 and Baseball-Reference Black Baseball Stats and Seamheads

Year of birth missing
Place of birth missing
Harrisburg Giants players
Baseball pitchers